Felton Winters "Pluto" Prewitt (May 17, 1924 – March 15, 1998) was an American football center.

Prewitt was born in Corsicana, Texas, and attended Corsicana High School. He played college football at center for the Tulsa Golden Hurricane from 1943 to 1945, including the 1944 team that defeated Georgia Tech in the 1945 Orange Bowl.

Prewitt was drafted by the Philadelphia Eagles in the fifth round (34th overall pick) of the 1943 NFL Draft, but did not play for the Eagles. Instead, he signed a contract in June 1946 to play professional football in the All-America Football Conference for the Buffalo Bisons. He played for the Bisons from 1946 to 1948 and for the Baltimore Colts in 1949. He appeared in 46 games, 30 as a starter.

Prewitt died in 1998 in Reno, Nevada.

References

1924 births
1998 deaths
American football centers
Buffalo Bisons (AAFC) players
Baltimore Colts players
Tulsa Golden Hurricane football players
Players of American football from Texas
Baltimore Colts (1947–1950) players